Perekopka is a rural locality (a khutor) and the administrative center of Perekopskoye Rural Settlement, Kletsky District, Volgograd Oblast, Russia. The population was 853 as of 2010. There are 13 streets.

Geography 
Perekopka is located in steppe, 29 km northeast of Kletskaya (the district's administrative centre) by road. Perekopskaya is the nearest rural locality.

References 

Rural localities in Kletsky District